Rajgarh Lok Sabha constituency is one of the 29 Lok Sabha constituencies in the Indian state of Madhya Pradesh. This constituency covers the entire Rajgarh district and parts of Guna and Agar Malwa districts.

Assembly segments
Rajgarh Lok Sabha constituency presently comprises the following eight Vidhan Sabha segments:

Members of Parliament

^by poll

Election results

2019 Lok Sabha

1998 Lok Sabha
 Lakshman Singh (Congress),
 Kailash Joshi (BJP)

1980 Lok Sabha
 Pandit, Vasantkumar Ramakrishna (JNP) : 161,299 votes  
 Mangilal Bhandari (INC-I) : 128,320

See also
 Rajgarh, Madhya Pradesh
 Rajgarh district
 Raigarh, a city formerly in MP, and now in Chhattisgarh State in India
 Raigarh district 
 List of Constituencies of the Lok Sabha

References

Lok Sabha constituencies in Madhya Pradesh
Rajgarh district